Cassia bakeriana, also known as the pink shower tree, is a flowering plant in the subfamily, Caesalpinioideae of the legume family, Fabaceae.

Gallery

References

External links

bakeriana
Flora of tropical Asia
Medicinal plants of Asia
Taxa named by William Grant Craib